Amblyseius pravus is a species of mite in the family Phytoseiidae.

References

pravus
Articles created by Qbugbot
Animals described in 1977